The Key of Solomon is a grimoire (textbook of magic) pseudoepigraphically attributed to King Solomon.

Key of Solomon may also refer to:

 The Lesser Key of Solomon, an anonymously authored grimoire of the 17th century, on the subject of demonology
 The Lost Symbol, working titled The Solomon Key, a 2009 novel by Dan Brown
 Solomon's Key, a 1986 puzzle video game developed by Tecmo
 Solomon's Key 2, a 1992 puzzle video game developed by Tecmo

See also
 Clavicula Salomonis (disambiguation)